Lina Qostal (born 11 March 1997) is a Moroccan tennis player.

Qostal has won one doubles title on the ITF tour in her career. On 19 May 2014, she reached her best singles ranking of world number 1165. On 10 November 2014, she peaked at world number 792 in the doubles rankings.

Qostal made her WTA tour debut at the 2013 Grand Prix SAR La Princesse Lalla Meryem, having been awarded a wildcard into both the singles and doubles draws. In singles, she was drawn against Karin Knapp and was beaten by the Italian in their first round encounter. She partnered with Alizé Lim in the doubles event but fared no better there, ultimately losing to Sandra Klemenschits and Andreja Klepač in the first round.

Qostal was born in Rabat. In 2018 she graduated from the University of Pennsylvania, where she was enrolled in the College of Arts and Sciences, and was a member of the women's varsity tennis team. 
Qostal previously studied at Lycée Descartes in the capital city of Morocco, Rabat.

Playing for Morocco at the Fed Cup, Qostal has a win–loss record of 9–3.

ITF Circuit Finals

Doubles: 1 (1–0)

Fed Cup participation

Singles

Doubles 

 Abandoned doesn't count in her overall record.

References

External links
 
 
 

1997 births
Living people
Moroccan female tennis players
Sportspeople from Rabat
Moroccan expatriates in the United States
21st-century Moroccan women